Min-kyung, also spelled Min-kyoung, is a Korean female given name. Its meaning differs based on the hanja used to write each syllable of the name. There are 27 hanja with the reading "min" and 54 hanja with the reading "kyung" the South Korean government's official list of hanja which may be used in given names.

People with this name include:
Sim Min-kyung (born 1955), stage name Sim Soo-bong, South Korean female singer
Min Kwon (full name Min-Kyung Kwon, born 1970s), South Korean-born American female pianist
Choi Min-kyung (born 1982), South Korean female short track speed skater
Jun Min-kyung (born 1985), South Korean female football goalkeeper
Hwang Min-kyoung (born 1990), South Korean female volleyball player
Kang Min-kyung (born 1990), South Korean female singer, member of Davichi
Haru Nomura (Korean name Mun Min-gyeong, born 1992), Japanese female golfer of Korean descent

See also
List of Korean given names

References

Korean feminine given names